KKLS may refer to:

 KKLS (AM), a radio station (920 AM) licensed to Rapid City, South Dakota, United States
 KKLS-FM, a radio station (104.7 FM) licensed to Sioux Falls, South Dakota, United States
 Southwest Washington Regional Airport (ICAO airport code: KKLS), formerly known as Kelso-Longview Regional Airport